The list of monarchs of the Anglo-Saxon kingdom of Sussex (or South Saxons) contains substantial gaps, as the chronological details relating to Sussex during the heptarchy is generally poorly documented. No authentic South Saxon king list or genealogy exists, unlike what can be found for other Anglo-Saxon kingdoms. Most kings are known only from Anglo-Saxon charters, some of which are forgeries, which makes it difficult to date the reigns of each king.  The monarchs were either known as kings or ealdormen.

According to the charters, most kings did not govern alone: Nothhelm reigned with two or three colleagues and Oslac with four. The locations of the lands granted in their charters indicate that they reigned jointly and that there was no division of territory. Such joint reigns can also be demonstrated for the Hwicce, the East Saxons, and the West Saxons. Indeed, “[t]here is nothing remarkable in the existence of two or even more contemporary kings in the same people in the seventh century. The ancient idea that royal dignity was a matter of birth rather than of territorial rule still survived at this date.”

The traditional residence of the South Saxon kings was at Kingsham, once outside the southern walls of Chichester although within its modern boundaries.

Kings and Ealdormen of the South Saxons

See also
List of monarchs of Wessex
List of English monarchs

Notes

References
 
 
 

 
Sussex

ru:Список королей Сассекса